Copromorpha narcodes is a moth in the Copromorphidae family. It is found in New Guinea.

References

External links
Natural History Museum Lepidoptera generic names catalog

Copromorphidae
Moths described in 1916